Kinghamia is a genus of African flowering plants in the daisy family.

 Species
 Kinghamia angustifolia (Benth.) C.Jeffrey
 Kinghamia engleriana (Muschl.) C.Jeffrey
 Kinghamia foliosa (O.Hoffm.) C.Jeffrey
 Kinghamia macrocephala (Oliv. & Hiern) C.Jeffrey
 Kinghamia nigritana (Benth.) C.Jeffrey

References

Asteraceae genera
Vernonieae
Flora of Africa